Alliage may refer to:

Alloy (alliage in French), a mixture or metallic solid solution composed of two or more elements
Alliage (band), a French boy band from 1996 to 2000
Alliage (film), 1985 film directed by André Almuró
Alliage (culture, science, technique), journal founded and directed by Jean-Marc Lévy-Leblond
"Alliage", brand of wine by Byington Vineyard
Alliage, 1960 electronic music by Jan Boerman